David Charles James (born 6 March 1945) is a retired Anglican bishop.  He was formerly the Bishop of Bradford in the Church of England.

James was educated at Nottingham High School and the University of Exeter. After graduating with a BSc, he gained his PhD in organometallic Chemistry before lecturing in chemistry at the University of Southampton.

Following his theological studies at St John's College, Nottingham, James was ordained in 1973 and began his ordained ministry with curacies at Highfield, Southampton and Goring-by-Sea. Following this he was Anglican chaplain at the University of East Anglia and then Vicar of East Ecclesfield before returning to Highfield.

James became suffragan Bishop of Pontefract in 1998 and then became the diocesan Bishop of Bradford in 2002. He was one of the rebel bishops who signed a letter against Rowan Williams' decision not to block the appointment of Jeffrey John as Bishop of Reading in 2003. The other diocesan bishop signatories (referred to by their opponents, since there were nine, as the Nazgûl) were: Michael Scott-Joynt (Bishop of Winchester), Michael Langrish (Exeter), Michael Nazir-Ali (Rochester), Peter Forster (Chester), James Jones (Liverpool), George Cassidy (Southwell & Nottingham), Graham Dow (Carlisle) and John Hind (Chichester). James retired on 14 July 2010.

References

1945 births
People educated at Nottingham High School
Alumni of the University of Exeter
Academics of the University of Southampton
People associated with the University of East Anglia
20th-century Church of England bishops
21st-century Church of England bishops
Bishops of Pontefract
Bishops of Bradford (diocese)
Living people
Alumni of St John's College, Nottingham